Santon Downham is a village and civil parish in the West Suffolk district of Suffolk in eastern England. In 2005 it had a population of 240. The village is located within Thetford Forest on a meander of the River Little Ouse on the Norfolk-Suffolk border.

History

The village was the administrative centre for the Eastern Forestry Commission for many years, following the planting of tens of thousands of trees in the Breckland to form the Thetford Forest. The District office and staff were housed in a 1960s office building close to the site of the now-demolished Downham Hall. The Hall garden formed the base for the nursery department of the district. The Forestry Commission repair depot was built close by in an award-winning building, next to which stood the Forestry Commission fire station. A Bedford 'Green Goddess' fire tender and a water tanker were kept in the fire station due to the high fire risk in the area.

In 1972 the bridge over the River Little Ouse appeared in programme 50 of the fifth series of BBC's sitcom Dad's Army, when Captain Mainwaring and his troops attempt to demolish it.

Climate
Santon Downham has an oceanic climate (Köppen: Cfb).

On 18 July 2022 a high of 38.1°C was recorded in Santon Downham, making it the hottest place in England and the United Kingdom on that day.

Transport
The Santon Downham Tramway was a 6-kilometre (3.7 mi) long narrow-gauge railway, which was operated around 1918 to 1922.

See also
Santon, Norfolk

References

External links
Village website
Village Hall website
Parish Council website
Explore Santon Downham at forestry.gov.uk

Villages in Suffolk
Forest Heath
Civil parishes in Suffolk